Dvoretzky is a surname. Notable people with the surname include:

 Aryeh Dvoretzky (1916–2008), Russian-born Israeli mathematician, eighth president of the Weizmann Institute of Science
 Moshe Dvoretzky (1922–1988), Bulgarian actor

See also
 Dvoretzky's theorem